Cladocephalus is a genus of green algae in the family Dichotomosiphonaceae.

References

External links

Bryopsidales
Ulvophyceae genera